Judith of Bohemia (c. 1056/58 – 25 December 1086), also known as Judith Přemyslid, was a member of the Přemyslid dynasty and duchess of Poland by marriage. She was a daughter of Duke Vratislaus II of Bohemia and Adelaide of Hungary, and was married to Władysław Herman.

Early life
Judith was born into the Přemyslid dynasty. She was the second of four children born to Vratislaus II of Bohemia and his second wife, Adelaide of Hungary. Her father became duke in 1061 and her mother died the next year.

Duchess of Poland
Around 1080, Judith married Duke Władysław Herman of Poland to solidify the recently established Bohemian-Polish alliance. According to contemporary chroniclers, Duchess Judith performed remarkable charity work, helping the needy and ensuring the comfort of subjects and prisoners. After almost five years of childless marriage, the necessity for an heir increased:

Because she was barren pray to God every day with tears and orations, made sacrifices and paying debts, helping widows and orphans, and given very generous amounts of gold and silver for the monasteries, commanded the priests to pray to the saints and the grace of God for a child.

On 10 June 1085, Judith and her husband were present at the coronation of her father, Vratislaus II, as the first king of Bohemia. One year later, on 20 August 1086, she gave birth to the long-awaited son and heir, Bolesław Wrymouth. She never recovered from the effects of childbirth and died on 25 December. She was buried in Cathedral of the Blessed Virgin Mary of Masovia in Płock.

References

 K. Jasiński: Rodowód pierwszych Piastów, Warsaw – Wrocław, 1992.

Bohemia
Bohemia
Year of birth uncertain
Bohemian princesses
Polish queens consort
Přemyslid dynasty
Medieval Bohemian nobility
Polish people of Czech descent
11th-century Bohemian people
11th-century Bohemian women
11th-century Polish people
11th-century Polish women
Deaths in childbirth